William Henry Dyson (3 September 1880 – 21 January 1938) was an Australian illustrator and political cartoonist.

In 1931 he was regarded as "one of the world's foremost black and white artists", and in 1980, "Australia's greatest cartoonist".

Personal life

Will Dyson was part of a literary family, with journalist and writer brother Edward 'Ted' Dyson (1865–1931), illustrator brother Ambrose Dyson (1876–1913), and three sisters also of artistic praise. His parents George and Jane came from England.

Dyson was a boxer of some note in the 1900s.

Artist Norman Lindsay was part of his social and professional circle and in 1909, Dyson, Lindsay, and Lindsay's illustrator sister Ruby, moved to London.  In 1910 he married Ruby. (Will's sister Jean later married Norman and Ruby's brother Lionel.)  She died as a result of the Spanish flu pandemic in 1919.

He returned to Australia in 1925, but for the 'mediocrity' of Melbourne, he then went to New York, and then returned London.

Dyson died suddenly but peacefully relaxed in an armchair on 21 January 1938, aged only 57 of heart failure.  He was survived by their only child, daughter Betty (1911–1956), a noted artistic designer.

Works
Before moving from Australia to London, Dyson was a caricaturist for The Bulletin and occasionally for Melbourne's Herald newspaper, he drew with a 'cruel and biting' style.

When he arrived in London Dyson went to work for the local Daily Herald. This was a left-wing paper edited by Charles Lapworth with Francis Meynell as the production manager. They published Dyson's acidic cartoons.

During World War I, Dyson became known for his war cartoons, with a satiric tone.

English writer H. G. Wells (1866–1946) was part of his professional circle.  He returned to Australia from 1925 to 1930, to the about-to-be-sold Melbourne Punch.  He later was the chief cartoonist for the Daily Herald in London.

Prominence
It was shortly after his wife's death in 1919 that he drew what was to become one of the most celebrated and widely reproduced of all cartoons, entitled 'Peace and Future Cannon Fodder', and astonishing in its uncanny foresight. Published in the British Daily Herald on 17 May 1919 (p.3), it showed David Lloyd George, Vittorio Orlando and Georges Clemenceau (the Prime Ministers of Britain, Italy and France respectively), together with Woodrow Wilson, the President of the United States, emerging after a meeting to discuss the Treaty of Versailles. Clemenceau, who was identified by his nickname 'The Tiger' is saying to the others: 'Curious! I seem to hear a child weeping!'. And there, behind a pillar, is a child in tears; labelled '1940 Class'.

Australia's first war artist
He was appointed as a temporary and honorary Lieutenant in December 1916, and went to the Western Front.

His "mission was to make characteristic drawings of life in the trenches", making him Australia's first-ever war artist; and the impact of his frontline experiences changed his cartooning direction from the militarists to the "sufferers".

Dyson later engaged in a debate with General Sir John Monash about his drawing of Diggers:
(Monash) I think artists like Will Dyson, Norman Lindsay, and others have failed to reproduce the typical 'Digger' face. They make him a gaunt, haggard man with harshness written on every facial line. They're wrong! 
(Dyson) Some bitter things have been said about the digger, but so far nothing so bitter as Sir John Monash's statement that, in the matter of looks, the digger is "mostly a sweet-faced, round-faced mamma's boy."

Legacy
Dyson's friend and colleague Charles Bean suggested that the Australian War Memorial should have a special Dyson gallery, so high was his respect for Dyson's work.  In 2016, the Memorial held more than 270 of Dyson's works, but had none of them on display.

See also
 1916 Pioneer Exhibition Game

Notes

References
 
 Hunter, Claire (2020), "'I'll never draw a line except to show war as the filthy business it is", Australian War Memorial, 28 April, 2020.
 Jensen, John (2004) Article: Dyson, William Henry [Will] [pseud. Emu] (1880–1938), cartoonist and printmaker , Oxford Dictionary of National Biography.
 Lindesay, Vane (1981), "Dyson, William Henry (Will) (1880–1938)", Australian Dictionary of Biography, Volume 8, MUP, 1981, pp 396–398. Retrieved on 6 October 2008.
 McMullin, Ross (2006), Will Dyson, Australia's Radical War Artist, Scribe Publications, Melbourne, 2006.
 Lieutenant William Henry Dyson, Australian War Memorial.

External links

1880 births
1938 deaths
People from Ballarat
Australian war artists
Australian illustrators
Australian people of English descent
Australian satirists
Cartoonists from Melbourne
Lindsay family